Albert Harrison Clancy (August 14, 1888 – October 17, 1951) was a Major League Baseball player. Clancy, a third baseman, was a right-handed batter who threw with his right arm. He had an official listed weight of 175 pounds.

Clancy appeared in three games with the St. Louis Browns in 1911. He was hitless in five at bats, reaching base once on a hit by pitch. Today, he is remembered as the first major league player from New Mexico.

External links
Clancy's major league statistics at Baseball-Reference.com

1888 births
1951 deaths
Major League Baseball third basemen
Baseball players from New Mexico
Sportspeople from Santa Fe, New Mexico
St. Louis Browns players
Pueblo Indians players
Austin Senators players